Daniel Freeman may refer to:

 Daniel Freeman (1826–1908), an American homesteader and Civil War veteran
 Daniel Freeman (Los Angeles County) (1837–1918), American farmer and land developer
 Daniel E. Freeman (born 1959), American musicologist
 Daniel Freeman (psychologist), British psychologist

See also
Daniel Freedman (disambiguation)
Daniel Friedman (disambiguation)
Daniel Freeman Hospital, California
Freeman-Maloy v Marsden